The M3 Stuart/Light Tank M3, was an American light tank of World War II. An improved version of the tank entered service as the M5 in 1942 to be supplied to British and other Commonwealth forces under lend-lease prior to the entry of the U.S. into the war. Afterwards, it was used by U.S. and Allied forces until the end of the war.

The British service name "Stuart" came from the American Civil War Confederate general J. E. B. Stuart and was used for both the M3 and the derivative M5 Light Tank. Unofficially, they were also often called "Honeys" by the British, because of their smooth ride. In U.S. use, the tanks were officially known as "Light Tank M3" and "Light Tank M5".

Stuarts were first used in combat in the North African campaign; about 170 were used by the British forces in Operation Crusader (18 November – 30 December 1941). Stuarts were the first American-crewed tanks in World War II to engage the enemy in tank versus tank combat when used in the Philippines in December 1941 against the Japanese. Outside of the Pacific War, in later years of WWII the M3 was used for reconnaissance and screening.

Development

Observing events in Europe and Asia during World War II, American tank designers realized that the Light Tank M2 was becoming obsolete and set about improving it. The upgraded design, with thicker armor, modified suspension and new gun recoil system was called "Light Tank M3". Production of the vehicle started in March 1941 and continued until October 1943.

By the standards of the era for light tanks, the Stuart was fairly heavily armored. It had 38 mm of armor on the upper front hull, 44 mm on the lower front hull, 51 mm on the gun mantlet, 38 mm on the turret sides, 25 mm on the hull sides, and 25 mm on the hull rear. Like its direct predecessor, the M2A4, the M3 was initially armed with a 37 mm M5 gun and five .30-06 Browning M1919A4 machine guns: one coaxial with the main gun, one on top of the turret in an M20 anti-aircraft mount, another in a ball mount in right bow, and two more in the right and left hull sponsons. Later, the main gun was replaced with the slightly longer M6, and the sponson machine guns were removed.

The M3 and M3A1 variants were powered by an air-cooled radial engine, either a gasoline-fueled 7-cylinder Continental W-670 (8,936 built) or a 9-cylinder Guiberson T-1020 diesel (1,496 built). Both of these powerplants were originally developed as aircraft engines. Internally, the radial engine was at the rear and the transmission at the front of the tank's hull. The propeller shaft connecting the engine and transmission ran through the middle of the fighting compartment. The radial engine's crankshaft was positioned high off the hull bottom and contributed to the tank's relatively tall profile. When a revolving turret floor was introduced in the M3 hybrid and M3A1, the crew had less room. A further 3,427 M3A3 variants were built with modified hull (similar to the M5), new turret and the Continental W-670 gasoline engine. In contrast to the M2A4, all M3/M5 series tanks had a trailing rear idler wheel for increased ground contact, whereas on the M2 the idler wheel was off the ground and did not aid in suspension.

M5 Stuart

To relieve wartime demand for the radial aero-engines used in the M3, a new version was developed using twin Cadillac V8 automobile engines and twin Hydra-Matic transmissions operating through a transfer case. This version of the tank was quieter, cooler and roomier; the automatic transmission also simplified crew training. The new model (initially called M4 but redesignated M5 to avoid confusion with the M4 Sherman) featured a redesigned hull with a raised rear deck over the engine compartment, sloped glacis plate and driver's hatches moved to the top. Although the main criticism from units using the Stuarts was that it lacked firepower, the improved M5 series kept the same 37 mm gun. The M5 gradually replaced the M3 in production from 1942 and, after the M7 project proved unsatisfactory, was succeeded by the Light Tank M24 in 1944. Total M5 and M5A1 tank production was 8,884; an additional 1,778 M8 75 mm howitzer motor carriages based on the M5 chassis with an open-top turret were produced.

Light Tank Doctrine

Light Tanks were issued to Tank Battalions (one of the four companies was a light tank company), Light Tank Battalions and Cavalry Reconnaissance Squadrons. The original role of the light tank in these formations was similar to  medium tanks and they were expected to engage enemy armor with AP rounds and enemy positions with HE rounds. As a result, tank gunnery training for Light and Medium tankers was common.

US Army Field Manuals written before 1944 clearly show that light tanks were to be part of an armored assault on enemy positions, and examples of fire on enemy armor were in these manuals. When pursuing an enemy, Light Tank Battalions were expected to move parallel with enemy columns and, together with accompanying infantry and engineer units, seize "critical terrain that will block hostile retreat". Despite the fact that light tank platoons were not expected to function as a reconnaissance unit, they could be used for reconnaissance purposes. In this role, they were expected to remain behind the main reconnaissance force as the support element and augment the firepower whenever enemy contact was made.

Combat history

War in North Africa and Europe
British and other Commonwealth armies were the first to use the Light Tank M3, as the "Stuart", in combat. From mid-November 1941 to the end of the year, about 170 Stuarts (in a total force of over 700 tanks) took part in Operation Crusader during the North Africa Campaign, with poor results. This is despite the fact that the M3 was superior or comparable in most regards to most of the tanks used by the Axis forces. The most numerous German tank, the Panzer III Ausf G, had nearly identical armor and speed to the M3, and both tanks' guns could penetrate the other tank's front armor from beyond . The most numerous Italian tank (and second most numerous Axis tank overall), the Fiat M13/40, was much slower than the Stuart, had slightly weaker armor all around, and could not penetrate the Stuart's front hull or turret armor at 1,000 meters, whereas the Stuart's gun could penetrate any spot on the M13/40. Although the high losses suffered by Stuart-equipped units during the operation had more to do with the better tactics and training of the Afrika Korps than the apparent superiority of German armored fighting vehicles used in the North African campaign, the operation revealed that the M3 had several technical faults. Mentioned in the British complaints were the 37 mm M5 gun and poor internal layout. The two-man turret crew was a significant weakness, and some British units tried to fight with three-man turret crews. The Stuart also had a limited range, which was a severe problem in the highly mobile desert warfare as units often outpaced their supplies and were stranded when they ran out of fuel.
On the positive side, crews liked its relatively high speed and mechanical reliability, especially compared to the Crusader tank, which comprised a large portion of the British tank force in Africa up until 1942. The Crusader had similar armament and armor to the Stuart while being slower, less reliable, and several tons heavier. The Stuart also had the advantage of a gun that could deliver high-explosive shells; HE shells were not available for the 40 mm QF 2-pdr gun mounted by most Crusaders, severely limiting their use against emplaced anti-tank guns or infantry;. The main drawback of the Stuart was its low fuel capacity and range; its operational range was only  cross country, roughly half that of the Crusader.

In the summer of 1942, the British usually kept Stuarts out of tank-to-tank combat, using them primarily for reconnaissance. The turret was removed from some examples to save weight and improve speed and range. These became known as "Stuart Recce". Some others were converted to armored personnel carriers known as the "Stuart Kangaroo", and some were converted into command vehicles and known as "Stuart Command". M3s, M3A3s, and M5s continued in British service until the end of the war, but British units had a smaller proportion of these light tanks than U.S. units.

Eastern Front
The other major Lend-Lease recipient of the M3, the Soviet Union, was less happy with the tank, considering it under-gunned, under-armored, likely to catch fire, and too sensitive to fuel quality. The M3's radial aircraft engine required high-octane fuel, which complicated Soviet logistics as most of their tanks used diesel or low-octane fuel. High fuel consumption led to a poor range characteristic, especially sensitive for use as a reconnaissance vehicle. Also, compared to Soviet tanks, the M3's narrower tracks resulted in a higher ground pressure, getting them more easily stuck in the Rasputitsa muddy conditions of spring and autumn and winter snow conditions on the Eastern Front. In 1943, the Red Army tried out the M5 and decided that the upgraded design was not much better than the M3. Being less desperate than in 1941, the Soviets turned down an American offer to supply the M5. M3s continued in Red Army service at least until 1944.

Italy
One of the more successful uses of the M5 in combat came during the Battle of Anzio when breaking through German forces surrounding the beachhead. The tactics called for an initial breakthrough by a medium tank company to destroy the heavier defenses, followed by an infantry battalion who would attack the German troops who were being left behind the medium tanks. Since many hidden fortifications and positions would have survived the initial medium tank assault, the infantry would then be confronted by any remaining fortified German troops. Behind the infantry came the M5s of a light tank company, who would attack these positions when directed to by the Infantry, usually by the use of green smoke grenades.

Pacific and Asia

The U.S. Army initially deployed 108 Stuart light tanks to the Philippines in September 1941, equipping the U.S. Army's 194th and 192nd Tank Battalions. The first U.S. tank versus tank combat to occur in World War II, began on 22 December 1941, when a platoon of five M3s led by Lieutenant Ben R. Morin engaged the Imperial Japanese Army (IJA) 4th Tank Regiment's Type 95 Ha-Go light tanks north of Damortis. Lt. Morin, with his 37mm cannon locked in recoil maneuvered his M3 off the road, but took a direct hit while doing so, and his tank began to burn. The other four M3s were also hit, but managed to leave the field under their own power. Lt. Morin was wounded, and he and his crew were captured by the enemy. M3s of the 194th and 192nd Tank Battalions continued to skirmish with the 4th Tank Regiment's tanks as they continued their retreat down the Bataan Peninsula, with the last tank versus tank combat occurring on 7 April 1942.

As the Japanese 15th Army was threatening southern Burma toward the end of February 1942, 7th Armoured Brigade of the British Army landed at Rangoon with 114 M-3 Stuarts bearing the green rodent of the "Desert Rats". They supported 17th Indian Division and 1st Burma Division on the retreat until they managed to escape to India in April.

Due to the naval nature of the Pacific campaign, steel for warship production took precedence over tanks for the IJA, creating by default an IJA light tank that performed admirably in the jungle terrain of the South Pacific. By the same measure, although the US was not hampered by industrial restrictions, the U.S. M3 light tank proved to be an effective armored vehicle for fighting in jungle environments. At least one was captured in the Philippines.

With the IJA's drive toward India within the South-East Asian theatre of World War II, the United Kingdom hastily withdrew their 2nd Royal Tank Regiment and 7th Hussars Stuart tank units (which also contained some M2A4 light tanks) from North Africa, and deployed them against the Japanese 14th Tank Regiment. By the time the Japanese had been stopped at Imphal, only one British Stuart remained operational. When the U.S. entered the war in 1941, it began to supply China with AFVs, including M3 Stuarts, and later M4 Sherman medium tanks and M18 Hellcat tank destroyers, which trickled in through Burma.

Although the U.S. light tanks had proven effective in jungle warfare, by late 1943, U.S. Marine Corps tank battalions were transitioning from their M3/M5 light tanks to M4 medium tanks, mostly for the much greater high-explosive blast effect of the M4's 75mm gun, which fired a much larger shell with a heavier explosive payload.

Obsolescence and replacement
When the U.S. Army joined the North African Campaign in late 1942, Stuart units still formed a large part of its armor strength. After the disastrous Battle of Kasserine Pass, the U.S. quickly followed the British in disbanding most of their light tank battalions and reorganizing medium tank battalions to include one company of light tanks, where the Stuarts mostly performed the traditional cavalry missions of scouting and screening; for the rest of the war, most U.S. tank battalions had three companies of M4 Shermans and one company of M3s or M5/M5A1s.

In Europe, Allied light tanks were given cavalry and infantry fire support roles since their light main armament was not competitive against heavier enemy armored fighting vehicles. However, the Stuart was still effective in combat in the Pacific Theater, as Japanese tanks were both relatively rare and were lighter in armor than even Allied light tanks. Japanese infantrymen were not well equipped with anti-tank weapons, and as such had to use close assault tactics. In this environment, the Stuart was only moderately more vulnerable than medium tanks.

Though the Stuart was to be completely replaced by the newer M24 Chaffee, the number of M3s/M5s produced was so great (over 25,000 including the 75mm HMC M8) that the tank remained in service until the end of the war, and well after. In addition to the U.S, UK and Soviet Union, who were the primary users, it was also used by France (M3A3 and M5A1), China (M3A3s and, immediately post-war, M5A1s) and Josip Broz Tito's Partisans in Yugoslavia (M3A3s and few M3A1).

With the limitations of both the main gun (see below) and armor, the Stuart's intended combat role in Western Europe was changed significantly. Light tank companies were often paired with cavalry reconnaissance units, or else used for guarding or screening, and even used in supply or messenger roles for medium tank units.

Limitations of the 37mm gun 

In January 1945, a report to General Eisenhower concluded that the Stuart was "obsolete in every respect as a fighting tank" and that it would not "turn the German fire [n]or [would] the 37mm gun damage the German tanks or SP guns".

Post World War II use

After the war, some countries chose to equip their armies with cheap and reliable war surplus Stuarts. The Chinese Nationalist Army having suffered great attrition as a result of the ensuing civil war, rebuilt their armored forces by acquiring surplus vehicles left behind in the Philippines by the U.S. forces, including 21 M5A1s to equip two tank companies.

M3A1 and M3A3s were used by British forces in Indonesia during the Indonesian National Revolution, where they suffered heavy losses due to the Stuart's thin armour plating. They were used until 1946, when the British left. The M3A1 and M3A3s were then passed on to the Royal Netherlands East Indies Army, which used them until the end of the fighting before passing on the tanks to the Indonesian Army. The tank saw action during the Darul Islam rebellions in Aceh and Java, RMS rebellions in South Maluku, PRRI rebellions in Sumatra, Permesta rebellions in Northern Sulawesi and the fighting against the 30 September Movement.

During the 1960s and 1970s, the Portuguese Army also used a small number of M5A1 Light Tanks, out of a total of 90 received as military aid from Canada in 1956, in the war in Angola, where its all terrain capability (compared to wheeled vehicles) was greatly appreciated. In 1967, the Portuguese Army deployed three M5A1 Light Tanks – nicknamed "Milocas", "Licas", and "Gina" by their crews – to northern Angola, which served with the 1927th Cavalry Battalion commanded by Cavalry Major João Mendes Paulo, stationed at Nambuangongo. The vehicles were mostly employed for convoy escort and recovery duties, and limited counterinsurgency operations against National Liberation Front of Angola (FNLA) guerrillas, who dubbed them "Elefante Dundum”. "Milocas" was destroyed by an accidental fire in 1969, while "Gina" and "Licas" were withdrawn from active service in 1972, the former being sent to Luanda and the latter ended up in 1973 as an airfield security pillbox in the Portuguese Air Force's Zala airfield. Period photographs show some modifications to the basic design, namely the omission of the bow machine gun, re-installed on a pintle mount in the roof of the turret, and a small searchlight fitted in front of the commander's cupola.

During the four-day long Football War of 1969, El Salvador invaded Honduras in an all-out-war strike using the M3 Stuart as the main battle tank. El Salvador captured eight major cities before the Organization of American States arranged a ceasefire.

The South African Armoured Corps continued to use M3A1s in a reserve role until 1955. Some were refurbished locally in 1962 and remained in service as late as 1964. The fleet was withdrawn in 1968, owing to parts shortage.

The M3 Stuart is still on the active list in the Armed Forces of Paraguay, with ten of the tanks being overhauled in 2014 to provide a training capability.

Variants

US variants

M3 (British designation "Stuart I")
5,811 vehicles were produced.
1,285 M3s had Guiberson diesel installed and were called "Stuart II" by British.
Late production M3s were fitted with turret developed for M3A1, though without turret basket. These tanks were dubbed "Stuart Hybrid".
M3A1 (Stuart III)
4,621 were produced from May 1942 to February 1943.
New turret with turret basket and no cupola. Gun vertical stabilizer installed. Sponson machine guns were removed.
211 M3A1s with Guiberson diesel were called "Stuart IV" by British.
M3A3 (Stuart V)
3,427 produced.
Put into production to integrate hull improvements brought by the M5 into the M3 series. Turret with rear overhang to house SCR-508 radio. Welded hull with sloped armor, 20° in from the vertical, on front and sides.
M5 (no British designation)
2,074 produced.
Twin Cadillac engines. Redesigned hull similar to M3A3, but with vertical sides and raised engine deck. Turret as for M3A1.
M5A1 (Stuart VI)
6,810 produced.
M5 with the turret of the M3A3; this was the major variant in US units by 1943.
75mm Howitzer Motor Carriage M8
1,778 units produced between September 1942 and January 1944.
Based on M5 chassis. The gun was replaced with the 75 mm M2/M3 howitzer in open turret and a trailer hook was fitted so an ammunition trailer could be towed. Provided fire support to cavalry reconnaissance squadrons.
T6 Armored Recovery Vehicle
Armoured recovery vehicle based on the chassis of an M5A1. Project was discontinued in 1943 in favor of the M24 Chaffee-based T6E1.
T16 4.5-inch Gun Motor Carriage
Self-propelled 4.5-inch gun based on the chassis of an M5. Project was discontinued in 1943.
T18 Howitzer Motor Carriage
Self-propelled gun based on M3 chassis. 75 mm M1A1 pack howitzer was mounted in a boxy superstructure. The project started in September 1941 and was abandoned in April 1942. Only two were produced, 75 mm Howitzer Motor Carriage M8 was chosen to be produced instead.
T27 / T27E1 Mortar Motor Carriage
M5A1 with turret replaced by superstructure in which an 81 mm mortar was installed. Also carried .50 (12.7 mm) cal Browning M2HB machine gun. The project was abandoned in April 1944 because of inadequate crew and storage space.
T29 Mortar Motor Carriage
Design similar to T27, with 4.2 inch (107 mm) mortar. Was abandoned for the same reason.
T56 Gun Motor Carriage
Self-propelled gun based on M3A3 chassis. The engine was moved to the middle of the hull and a 3-inch (76 mm) gun was mounted in a superstructure in the rear. The project started in September 1942 and was abandoned in February 1943.
T57 Gun Motor Carriage
Variant of T56 with Continental engine of the Medium Tank M3. Also dropped in February 1943.
T81 Chemical Mortar Motor Carriage
M5A1-based 4.2 inch (107 mm) chemical mortar carrier.
T82 Howitzer Motor Carriage
Self-propelled 105 mm howitzer based on M5A1 chassis. Development began in 1943. Two prototypes built and tested in August 1944 at Aberdeen Proving Grounds. Project was discontinued on June 21, 1945.
M3 with Maxson Turret
Anti-aircraft variant developed in 1942. Was armed with four .50 (12.7 mm) cal. machine guns in a turret developed by Maxson Corp. The project was rejected because of the availability of the M16 MGMC.
155 mm Howitzer Motor Carriage T64
Self-propelled howitzer based on lengthened M5 with 155 mm howitzer M1. One built, but replaced by the M41 Howitzer Motor Carriage based on the Light Tank M24 chassis.
40 mm Gun Motor Carriage T65
Anti-aircraft vehicle based on lengthened M5A1 with Bofors 40 mm gun. Not proceeded with but ideas used in developing M19 Multiple Gun Motor Carriage using the Light Tank M24 chassis.
20 mm Multiple Gun Motor Carriage T85
Anti-aircraft vehicle based on same chassis as T65 (M5A1). Armed with quad Oerlikon 20 mm cannons.
M3/M5 Command Tank
M3/M5 with turret replaced by small superstructure with a .50 (12.7 mm) cal. machine gun.
T8 Reconnaissance Vehicle
M5 with turret removed and mounting for .50 (12.7 mm) cal machine gun
M3 with T2 Light Mine Exploder
Developed in 1942, was rejected.
M3/M3A1 with Ronson flamethrower replacing the main gun. 24 tanks were converted by Seabees for the US Marine Corps in 1943.
M5A1 with E5R1-M3 Flame Gun
Flame thrower installed instead of the hull machine gun.
M3A1 with E5R2-M3 Flame-gun
Flame thrower installed in place of hull machine gun.
M5 Dozer
M5 with dozer blade. Turret was usually removed.
M5 with T39 Rocket Launcher
T39 launcher with 20  rockets mounted on the top of the turret. Never reached production.
M5A1 with E7-7 Flame Gun
Flame thrower installed instead of the main gun.
M5A1 with E9-9 Flame-throwing equipment
Prototype only.
M5A1 with E8 Flame-gun
Turret replaced by boxy superstructure with flame thrower in a smaller turret. Prototype only.

UK variants

Stuart Recce
Reconnaissance vehicle based on turretless Stuart.
Stuart Command
Stuart Kangaroo with extra radios.
Stuart artillery tractor
Another turretless variant similar in appearance to the Recce and Kangaroo. Used to tow the Ordnance QF 17 pounder. Not to be confused with the US M5 Tractor.

Brazilian variants

In the 1970s, the Brazilian company Bernardini developed a series of radical Stuart upgrades for the Brazilian Army.
X1A
Based on M3A1, this design had new engine ( Saab-Scania diesel), improved suspension, new upper hull armor, fire controls and DEFA 90 mm gun in a new turret. 80 vehicles were produced.
X1A1
An X1A with improved suspension with three bogies (instead of two) each side and raised idler.
X1A2
Based on the X1A1, this version retained almost nothing of the original Stuart as even its hull was redesigned.

Yugoslav partisans variants 
Yugoslav partisans received Stuarts from the British Army. In 1945, obsolete as tanks, many were modified to carry specialized armament:
 M3A1 with 81 mm mortar: 2 built
 M3A1 and M3A3 with 7.5 cm Pak 40 designated SO-75 
 M3A3 with four guns Flakvierling 38: 1 built
 M3A3 with 7.5 cm Pak 50: 5 built
 M3A3 with 15 cm sIG 33: 1 built designated SO-150

Operators

Current operators

 — 10 in service (5 M3 and 5 M3A1) and 4 in storage in 2014.

Former operators
 — Around 370.

 — 18 M3A1, last 4 donated by Venezuela for training.
 — 350 M3A2, M3A3/A5.
 — Stuart V (M3A3) tanks were widely used in the reconnaissance troop of armoured regiments. In the 2nd Canadian Armoured Brigade after the Normandy landings, the establishment for each regiment was 49 Sherman tanks, both 75 mm and 17-pounder, and up to 9 Stuart tanks.

 — Some captured from the Nationalist Chinese Army during the Chinese Civil War, but primary received from the Soviet Union.

 — imported from the United States; put into operation around the year 1945.
 — eight M3A1 and five M5A1.
 — captured at least three from the Soviets.

 — M3A1 and M3A3 from the Netherlands.

 — Operated captured vehicles, for example in the Philippines and at the Battle of Imphal.

 — The M3A1 was supplied in 1941–42 (89) and some were used in the Pacific. They were withdrawn in 1953–55.
 — four M3A1 were used by the National Guard from the mid-1940s to 1979.

 
 — 70 vehicles in service with the Portuguese Army and other 20 with the Republican National Guard from 1956 to 1972.
 — captured at least five from the Soviets

 — 210 British M3s received from 1942 to 1944.

 44 tanks were received in 1944 through the EDA (Excess Defense Article) program from 1942 – 1945, were in use for training until 1999.

 — 1,676 M3 series tanks received as part of Lend-Lease, and 5 M5 series tanks.

 — M3A1 and M3A3, used during and after the war.

Surviving examples
 The Ontario Regiment Museum has an operational M3 Stuart.
Indonesian Army retains one M3A1 Stuart in operational condition used for historical theater show.

In the media

The 1941 US military propaganda short film The Tanks Are Coming. features the M3 and its manufacturing process.
The 1945 Mexican film comedy "Un día con el diablo" (A Day with the devil) uses several Mexican Army M3s.
Modified Stuarts were used in the movie Attack! as German tanks.
An M3 was the center piece of The Green Hornet episode "Seek, Stalk, & Destroy".
A "24k gold" M3 was created from gold bullion in the Batman episode "Penguin's Disastrous End". It was stopped with the "Batzooka".
Season 5 of the TV series The Twilight Zone had an episode "The 7th Is Made Up of Phantoms" featuring an M3 Stuart and its crew going back in time to the Battle of Little Big Horn.
"Haunted Tank" was a DC Comics feature that appeared in G.I. Combat starring an M3 Stuart. It ran from 1961 to 1987.  The tank was "haunted" by the ghost of J.E.B Stuart, who gave cryptic warnings to the crew.
An M3 was featured in the movie Under Fire as a Nicaraguan National Guard tank.
The M3 was added to the 2006 strategy game, Company of Heroes, by the Opposing Fronts expansion as a buildable unit for the British.
A heavily modified M5A1 Stuart was featured in the movie Tank Girl as the eponymous heroine's tank.
A M5A1 Stuart tank was featured in the James Bond movie Licence to Kill. The tank opens fire on the Chinese hideout in the fictional country Isthmus, and saves Bond.
The sole operational M3A1 Stuart of the Indonesian Army were featured in the movies  (Blood of Eagles) and Hati Merdeka (Hearts of Freedom), part of the Merah Putih (Red and White) trilogy, as Dutch tank.
An M3 or M5 was used as a prop German tank in the propaganda film that Steve Rogers was in part way into Captain America: The First Avenger.

See also

 Rhino tank
 SCR-245
 List of U.S. military vehicles by model number
 G-numbers

Notes
Notes

Citations

References

External links

AFV Database(Pictures )
OnWar: M3 Stuart M3A1 Stuart M3A3 StuartM5A1 Stuart
M5A1 Stuart Light Tank Photos and Walk Arounds on Prime Portal

Berwick RAILFAN – Excursions To Our Past – Berwick American Car & Foundry, Berwick Forge & Fabricating, Berwick Freight Car Co. 
M3 Stuart tank  & M5A1 Stuart tank  at U.S. Veterans Memorial Museum
Description of Stuart tank, with video of surviving tanks rolling

Light tanks of the United States
World War II tanks of the United States
World War II light tanks
Military vehicles introduced from 1940 to 1944
J. E. B. Stuart
Tanks introduced in 1941